A leadership school is an organization, or entity within an organization, that provides education that focuses on the development of leaders. 

This activity can be undertaken at different levels. It can be in the form of training, seminars, institutes, or of more comprehensive frameworks that lead to the awarding of a certificate, degree, or diploma.
The leadership curriculum is intended to shape leadership behavior and the approach used in developing the curriculum can vary, depending on the beliefs of the founders. These things make leadership have a rich and broad meaning which can also make it difficult for some people who want to study leadership to find a common ground.

See also
National School of Leadership
National Outdoor Leadership School
Korean Minjok Leadership Academy
THNK School of Creative Leadership

Leadership studies